Ericthonius rubricornis is a species of amphipod in the family Ischyroceridae. It is found in South America, North America, and Europe.

References

Amphipoda
Articles created by Qbugbot
Crustaceans described in 1853